Alto Acre Futebol Club, commonly known as Alto Acre, is a Brazilian association football club based in Epitaciolândia, Acre. The club currently doesn't play in any league, having last participated in the Campeonato Acreano in the 2017 season.

History
The club was founded on 31 March 2009. They competed in the Campeonato Acriano in 2010, when they were finished in the fifth position.

Stadium
Alto Acre Futebol Club play their home games at Estádio Antônio Araújo Lopes. The stadium has a maximum capacity of 3,500 people.

References

Association football clubs established in 2009
Inactive football clubs in Brazil
Football clubs in Acre (state)
2009 establishments in Brazil